Althaea hirsuta, the hairy marshmallow, is a species of annual herb in the family Malvaceae. They have a self-supporting growth form and simple, broad leaves.

Sources

References

Malveae